Tej Bahadur Singh (1947-2013) was a member of the Indian National Congress who represented Rari state assembly constituency in Jaunpur district of Uttar Pradesh. Being active in youth politics since college days, he was also the president of Youth Congress, Mr. Singh was also the president of management committee of the famous T.D college of jaunpur.

References 

http://timesofindia.indiatimes.com/city/varanasi/Former-Congress-MLA-dies-in-accident/articleshow/25035535.cms

1947 births
2013 deaths